Stephen Pearse is an investor and entrepreneur who previously served as Chairman of Maxwell Biosciences, Chairman of Techtonic Group LLC, Chairman of the Advisory Board at Innovation Pavilion, and Principal at Yucatan Rock Ventures. He was appointed to the Nasa Advisory Board in 2013. He was previously CEO of Cyras Systems until its sale in 2000 to Ciena Corporation for $2.6 billion.

References

20th-century American businesspeople
21st-century American businesspeople
American chairpersons of corporations
American computer businesspeople
American investors
American technology chief executives
American technology company founders
Businesspeople in information technology
Living people
Year of birth missing (living people)